The Munster Senior Cup is a rugby union competition for the senior clubs affiliated to the Munster branch of the Irish Rugby Football Union.

The winners compete with the other three provincial cup winners for the All-Ireland Cup.

Top winners

List of winners

1880s

 1885–86 Bandon beat Garryowen
 1886–87 Queens College beat Limerick County
 1887–88 Queens College beat Garryowen
 1888–89 Garryowen beat Limerick County

1890s

 1890 Garryowen beat Queens College
 1891 Garryowen
 1892 Garryowen beat Queens College
 1893 Garryowen beat Cork
 1894 Garryowen
 1895 Garryowen beat Cork County
 1896 Garryowen beat Cork County
 1897 Queens College beat Rockwell College
 1898 Garryowen beat Queens College
 1899 Garryowen beat Queens College 10-3

1900s

 1900 Queens College beat Tralee
 1901 Queens College beat Cork Constitution
 1902 Garryowen beat Rockwell College
 1903 Garryowen beat Queens College
 1904 Garryowen beat Rockwell College
 1905 Cork Constitution beat Queens College
 1906 Cork Constitution beat Garryowen Football Club
 1907 Cork Constitution beat Garryowen Football Club
 1908 Garryowen beat Rockwell College
 1909 Garryowen beat Lansdowne

1910s

 1910 Cork Constitution beat Lansdowne
 1911 Garryowen beat Landsdowne
 1912 UCC beat Garryowen
 1913 UCC beat Garryowen
 1914 Garryowen beat UCC
 1915
 1916
 1917
 1918
 1919

1920s

 1920 Garryowen beat Cork Constitution
 1921 Dolphin RFC beat Cork Constitution
 1922 Cork Constitution beat Garryowen
 1923 Cork Constitution beat Garryowen
 1924 Garryowen
 1925 Garryowen
 1926 Garryowen
 1927 Bohemians beat Dolphin
 1928 Young Munster beat Cork Constitution
 1929 Cork Constitution beat Young Munster

1930s

 1930 Young Munster beat UCC
 1931 Dolphin beat Garryowen
 1932 Garryowen beat Cork Constitution
 1933 Cork Constitution beat Bohemians
 1934 Garryowen beat Sundays Well
 1935 UCC beat Cork Constitution
 1936 UCC beat Cork Constitution
 1937 UCC beat Garryowen
 1938 Young Munster beat UCC
 1939 UCC beat Bohemians

1940s

 1940 Garryowen beat Dolphin
 1941 UCC beat Dolphin
 1942 Cork Constitution beat UCC
 1943 Cork Constitution beat Army
 1944 Dolphin beat Garryowen
 1945 Dolphin beat Army
 1946 Cork Constitution beat Garryowen
 1947 Garryowen beat Young Munster
 1948 Dolphin beat Young Munster
 1949 Sundays Well beat Dolphin

1950s

 1949–50 UCC beat Garryowen
 1950–51 UCC beat Dolphin
 1951–52 Garryowen beat UCC
 1952–53 Sundays Well beat Garryowen
 1953–54 Garryowen beat Sundays Well
 1954–55 UCC beat Old Crescent
 1955–56 Dolphin beat Sundays Well
 1956–57 Cork Constitution 
 1957–58 Bohemians R.F.C. beat Highfield
 1958–59 Bohemians R.F.C. beat Shannon

1960s

 1959–60 Shannon beat UCC 8–8, 6–3 (replay)
 1960–61 Cork Constitution beat Garryowen
 1961–62 Bohemians R.F.C. beat Old Crescent
 1962–63 UCC beat Sundays Well
 1963–64 Cork Constitution beat Young Munster
 1964–65 Cork Constitution beat Sundays Well
 1965–66 Highfield beat UCC
 1966–67 Cork Constitution beat Highfield
 1967–68 Highfield beat Cork Constitution
 1968–69 Garryowen beat Sundays Well

1970s

 1969–70 Cork Constitution beat Garryowen
 1970–71 Garryowen beat Young Munster
 1971–72 Cork Constitution beat Garryowen
 1972–73 Cork Constitution beat Dolphin
 1973–74 Garryowen beat Shannon
 1974–75 Garryowen beat Cork Constitution
 1975–76 UCC beat Dolphin
 1976–77 Shannon beat Garryowen
 1977–78 Shannon beat Garryowen
 1978–79 Garryowen beat Young Munster

1980s

 1979–80 Young Munster beat Bohemians
 1980–81 UCC beat Shannon
 1981–82 Shannon beat Young Munster
 1982–83 Cork Constitution beat Shannon
 1983–84 Young Munster beat Waterpark
 1984–85 Cork Constitution beat Shannon
 1985–86 Shannon beat Garryowen
 1986–87 Shannon beat Highfield
 1987–88 Shannon beat Garryowen
 1988–89 Cork Constitution beat shannon

1990s

 1989–90 Young Munster beat UCC
 1990–91 Shannon beat Young Munster
 1991–92 Shannon beat Young Munster
 1992–93 Garryowen beat Young Munster
 1993–94 Sundays Well beat Young Munster
 1994–95 Garryowen beat Young Munster
 1995–96 Shannon beat Cork Constitution
 1996–97 Garryowen beat Young Munster
 1997–98 Shannon beat Young Munster
 1998–99 Garryowen beat Cork Constitution

2000s

 1999–2000 Shannon beat Young Munster
 2000–01 Shannon beat Young Munster
 2001–02 Shannon beat Young Munster
 2002–03 Shannon beat Midleton
 2003–04 Shannon beat Garryowen
 2004–05 Shannon beat Garryowen
 2005–06 Shannon beat Dolphin
 2006–07 Garryowen beat Cork Constitution
 2007–08 Shannon beat Highfield 12–6
 2008–09 Cork Constitution beat Old Crescent

2010s
 2009–10 Young Munster beat UCC 22–13
 2010–11 Bruff beat  Garryowen 23–19
 2011–12 Garryowen beat Bruff 19–9
 2012–13 Cork Constitution beat UL-Bohemians 15–14
 2013–14 Cork Constitution beat Garryowen 9–6
 2014–15 Cork Constitution beat Garryowen 26–22
 2015–16 Cork Constitution beat Young Munster 14–7
 2016–17 Cork Constitution beat Young Munster 14–0
 2017–18 Garryowen beat UL Bohemian 18–3
 2018–19Cork Constitution beat Garryowen 26–23
 2019–20 Cork Constitution beat Young Munster 24–17

2020s
 2020–21 Young Munster beat Shannon 26–14
 2021–22 Young Munster beat Garryowen 11–8
 2022-23 Young Munster beat Nenagh Ormond 27-24

See also
 Connacht Senior Cup
 Leinster Senior Cup
 Ulster Senior Cup

External sources
 The Carling Story of Munster Rugby by Charlie Mulqueen

References

Rugby union competitions in Munster
Irish senior rugby competitions
1885 establishments in Ireland